The  is the prefectural parliament of Wakayama Prefecture.

Members
Below are the members of the assembly, .

References

External links
Official site

Prefectural assemblies of Japan
Politics of Wakayama Prefecture